Royal Farms is a privately owned chain of convenience stores headquartered in Baltimore, Maryland. The company operates more than 200 stores throughout Maryland, Delaware, Pennsylvania, New Jersey, Virginia and West Virginia with plans to expand into North Carolina. Many of the stores also have gasoline and electric vehicle charging sold on the premises, as well as house-made fried chicken, chicken sandwiches, and fries.

Overview

Royal Farms is owned by Cloverland Farms Dairy and the name Royal Farms was chosen when Cloverland Farms Dairy merged with Royal Dunloggin Dairy and then decided to open a convenience store using the word Royal from Royal Dunloggin and Farms from Cloverland Farms. Known for their fried chicken and giant cockerel statues. Royal Farms opened its first store in 1959 in Baltimore, which remains where the company's headquarters are based.

, Royal Farms has 214 locations throughout the Mid-Atlantic states. More than 100 are in the home state of Maryland. The chain sells many typical convenience-store items, such as coffee, candy, soft drinks, bagels and donuts, lottery tickets, and other basic groceries. All locations offer a kitchen serving hot food items. Royal Farms' major competitors include Wawa, Sheetz, 7-Eleven, Rutter's, High's and Turkey Hill Minit Markets. They have self check out.

In September 2014, Royal Farms purchased naming rights to the Baltimore Arena. On November 22, 2022, Royal Farms announced that it would open up its first North Carolina location in early 2023, with more locations coming soon to that state.

References

External links

 

Companies based in Baltimore
Privately held companies of the United States
Economy of the Eastern United States
Chicken chains of the United States
Convenience stores of the United States
Gas stations in the United States
Automotive fuel retailers
Retail companies established in 1959
1959 establishments in Maryland
American companies established in 1959